Mazaeus or Mazday (Aramaic: 𐡌𐡆𐡃𐡉 MZDY, Greek: Μαζαῖος Mazaios) (died 328 BC) was an Achaemenid Persian noble and satrap of Cilicia and later satrap of Babylon for the Achaemenid Empire, a satrapy which he retained under Alexander the Great.

Life
Mazaeus was the penultimate Persian satrap (governor) of Cilicia. His successor in Cilicia was Arsames, who was ultimately expelled by Alexander the Great.

At the Battle of Gaugamela, Mazaeus commanded the right flank with the Syrian, Median, Mesopotamian, Parthian, Sacian, Tapurian, Hyrcanian, Sacesinian, Cappadocian, and Armenian cavalry.

As a reward for his recognition of Alexander as the legitimate successor of Darius, Mazaeus was rewarded by being able to retain the satrapy of Babylon, as a Hellenistic satrap. Alexander left a Macedonian, Apollodorus of Amphipolis, as the military commander of the garrison of Babylon, and another as tax-collector. Mazaeus continued minting coins under his name, and later without his name.

The daughter of the Persian king Darius III, Stateira II, was originally betrothed to him, but he died before they could be married. She was eventually married to Alexander.

Waldemar Heckel suggested that the Alexander Sarcophagus might have been dedicated to him.

Mazaeus was replaced as satrap of Babylon by Stamenes.

Coinage
Mazaeus had an abundant coinage, which he minted in Tarsos, Sidon and Babylon.
Coinage as Satrap of Cilicia

Coinage as Satrap of Babylon

References

Year of birth missing
328 BC deaths
Satraps of the Alexandrian Empire
4th-century BC Iranian people
Achaemenid satraps of Cilicia
Darius III